Polyprion is a genus of marine ray-finned fish from the family Polyprionidae, the wreckfishes.

Species
The genus contains two species:

 Polyprion americanus (Bloch & Schneider, 1801) (Atlantic wreckfish)
 Polyprion oxygeneios (Schneider & Forster, 1801) (Hāpuku)

References

Polyprionidae